888 (eight hundred eighty-eight) is the natural number following 887 and preceding 889.

In mathematics
888 is a repdigit (a number all of whose digits are equal), and a strobogrammatic number (one that reads the same upside-down on a seven-segment calculator display). 8883 = 700227072 is the smallest cube in which each digit occurs exactly three times, and the only cube in which three distinct digits each occur three times. 888  the smallest multiple of 24 whose digit sum is 24, and as well as being divisible by its digit sum it is divisible by all of its digits.

888 is a practical number, meaning that every positive integer up to 888 itself may be represented as a sum of distinct divisors of 888.

There are exactly 888 trees with four unlabeled and three labeled nodes, exactly 888 seven-node undirected graphs without isolated vertices, and exactly 888 non-alternating knots whose crossing number is 12.

It is a happy number, meaning that repeatedly summing the squares of its digits eventually leads to 1:

888 →64+64+64= 192→1+81+4= 86→64+36=100→1

Symbolism and numerology

The number 888 is often symbolised within the international labour movement to symbolise the 8-hour day. Workers protested for 8 hours work, 8 hours rest and 8 hours time to themselves.

In some Christian numerology, the number 888 represents Jesus, or sometimes more specifically Christ the Redeemer. This representation may be justified either through gematria, by counting the letter values of the Greek transliteration of Jesus' name, or as an opposing value to 666, the number of the beast. The numerological representation of Jesus with the number 888, as the sum of the numerical values of the letters of his name, was condemned by the Church father Irenaeus as convoluted and an act which reduced "the Lord of all things" to something alphabetical.

In Chinese numerology, 888 usually means triple fortune, as a form of strengthening of the digit 8. On its own, the number 8 is often associated with great fortune, wealth and spiritual enlightenment. Hence, 888 is considered triple. For this reason, addresses and phone numbers containing the digit sequence 888 are considered particularly lucky, and may command a premium because of it.

See also 
 888 (disambiguation)

References

Integers